Les Deux Alpes is a commune in the department of Isère, southeastern France. The municipality was established on 1 January 2017 by merger of the former communes of Mont-de-Lans (the seat) and Vénosc. The ski resort Les Deux Alpes is situated in the commune.

See also 
Communes of the Isère department

References 

Communes of Isère